The Livermore Valley Wine Country Championship was a golf tournament on the Nationwide Tour from 2006 to 2008. It was played at The Course at Wente Vineyards in Livermore, California, United States.

The 2008 purse was $600,000, with $108,000 going to the winner.

Winners

Bolded golfers graduated to the PGA Tour via the final Nationwide Tour money list.

External links
PGATOUR.com Tournament website

Former Korn Ferry Tour events
Golf in California
Livermore Valley
Sports in the San Francisco Bay Area
Recurring sporting events established in 2006
Recurring sporting events disestablished in 2008
Defunct sports competitions in the United States
2006 establishments in California
2008 disestablishments in California